Fiend of Dope Island, also released as Whiplash, was a lurid men's adventure type motion picture filmed in 1959 and released in 1961. The picture starred and was co-written by Bruce Bennett and was the final film directed by Nate Watt.  It was filmed in Puerto Rico where producer J. Harold Odell had previously filmed his Machete (1958) and Counterplot (1959). Several scenes were censored for the United States release. The film co-stars Tania Velia, billed as the "Yugoslavian Bombshell" who had appeared in the July 1959 Playboy, and Puerto Rican actor Miguel Ángel Álvarez.

Plot
Charlie Davis runs his own island in the Caribbean with a literal whip hand. He makes his income as a marijuana grower, exporter and gunrunner. He hires a female entertainer to amuse the clients of his cantina and himself.

Charlie's world falls apart when one of his employees is an undercover narcotics investigator. The trouble escalates to a full native rebellion and shark attack.

Legacy
The Cramps named their 2002 record album Fiends of Dope Island after the film.

Cast
Bruce Bennett as Charlie Davis
Robert Bray as David
Tania Velia as Glory La Verne
Ralph A. Rodriguez as Naru
Miguel Ángel Álvarez as Capt. Fred

Notes

External links

1950s adventure films
1959 films
American films about cannabis
Films set in the Caribbean
Films shot in Puerto Rico
American black-and-white films
Films directed by Nate Watt
American adventure films
1960s English-language films
1950s English-language films
Films produced by David Odell
1950s American films
1960s American films